Let the Whole World Sing is an album by Jimmy Sturr and His Orchestra, released through Rounder Records on August 5, 2008. In 2009, the album won the group the Grammy Award for Best Polka Album.

Track listing
 "Heartaches by the Number" (Harlan Howard) – 1:53
 "Let the Whole World Sing It with Me" (Noe) – 1:53
 "Suck It In" (Garrett) – 2:51
 "Hank's Magic" (Sturr) – 3:49
 "The Wedding Song" (Betteridge) – 2:40
 "I Love You Because" (Leon Payne) – 1:57
 "Stop What You're Doin'" (Mechem, Seibert, Viglietta) – 3:10
 "Manhattan Spiritual" (Billy Maxted) – 2:50
 "Polkaholic" (Harris, Wing) – 2:31
 "Wojenko" – 3:11
 "Connecticut Oberek" (Przasnyski) – 2:09
 "Love and Laughter" (DiPreta, Prose) – 4:05
 "Last Date" (Floyd Cramer) – 3:39
 "Polka Sturred" (Wing) – 2:31

Personnel

 Ray Barno Orchestra – Sax (Baritone)
 Ian Betteridge – Composer
 Dennis Coyman – Drums
 Floyd Cramer – Composer
 Nick Devito – Clarinet, Sax (Alto)
 Joe Donofrio – Producer, Mixing
 Pat Garrett – Composer
 Devon Guillery – Design
 Ted Harris – Composer
 Allen Henson – Vocals (background)
 Harlan Howard – Composer
 Ken Irwin – Producer, Mixing
 The Jordanaires – Vocals (background)
 Johnny Karas – Sax (Tenor), Vocals
 Dave Kowalski – Engineer
 Kevin Krauth – Trumpet
 Joe Magnuszewski – Clarinet, Sax (Alto)
 Raul Malo – Vocals, Guest Appearance
 Billy Maxted – Composer

 Dr. Toby Mountain – Mastering
 Dale Noe – Composer
 Louis Dean Nunley – Vocals (background)
 Ted Olson – Liner Notes
 Eric Parks – Trumpet
 Rich Pavasaris – Bass
 Leon Payne – Composer
 Al Piatkowski – Accordion
 Tom Pick – Producer, Mixing, Overdub Engineer
 Nancy Seibert – Composer
 Keith Slattery – Piano
 Jimmy Sturr – Arranger, Composer, Mixing
 Steve "Rocky" Swiader – Accordion
 Dana Sylvander – Trombone
 Frank Urbanovitch – Fiddle, Vocals
 Terry Waddell – Arranger
 Henry Will – Arranger
 Lance Wing – Composer, Vocals, Guest Appearance
 Curtis Young – Vocals (background)

See also
 Polka in the United States

References

2008 albums
Jimmy Sturr albums
Rounder Records albums
Grammy Award for Best Polka Album